Andreanne Nouyrigat is a French actress, who lives and works primarily in India. She has appeared in supporting and leading roles in Tamil cinema.contestant of Cooku with comali Season 4

Career
Andreane Nouyrigat was born in France, but settled and spent her childhood in Pondicherry, India from the age of six. For her higher studies, she returned to France and trained to become a veterinarian nurse, but later returned to India to attempt to enter the film industry. In 2000, Andreanne was an extra in the telefilm Le Passeur D’enfant set in Pondicherry and then later appeared in the French stageplays, La Jeune Fille, Le Diable Et Le Moulin (2001) produced by Olivier Py and Sketches (2004) by Jean-Philippe Ribes. She then played an extra in the "Athiradee" song in Shankar's Sivaji (2007) starring Rajinikanth and Shriya Saran. Post her studies, Andreanne began modelling for Indian companies such as Shelton Shirts, DVY photoshoot, Kumaran Silks Online, Vijaya Ganapathy Stores and Freshdesk amongst other opportunities. She also walked down the ramp for the designer, Chaitanya Rao, in 2014. 

Andreanne then moved on to appear in Tamil films, often dubbing her own lines as she is familiar with the Tamil language. In 2013, she first shot for the low budget films Kanden Kadhal Konden (2016) and Saalaiyoram (2016), but her first release was C. V. Kumar's Enakkul Oruvan (2015), where she featured as a friend of the character portrayed by Siddharth. She later notably played a ghosts in the horror film Zero (2016), the comedy lead opposite Soori in the Sivakarthikeyan-starrer Rajini Murugan (2016) and a Russian woman in Rum (2017). Andreanne then portrayed her first lead role in the comedy film, Melnaattu Marumagan (2018) alongside Rajkamal. In the film, she played a foreigner from France and dubbed her own lines in Tamil.

Filmography

Films

Television

References

External links
 

Living people
People from Pondicherry
French expatriates in India
French actresses
French film actresses
French stage actresses
French voice actresses
Actresses in Tamil cinema
European actresses in India
Actresses of European descent in Indian films
21st-century French actresses
Year of birth missing (living people)